John Hamilton, 4th Earl of Haddington (1626 - 31 August 1669) was a Scottish nobleman.

Life
Haddington was born in 1626, second son of Thomas Hamilton, 2nd Earl of Haddington and Lady Catherine Erskine, a daughter of John Erskine, Earl of Mar.

Lord Haddington was a minor in 1645, when he succeeded his brother Thomas who had died from consumption in that year. Owing to lameness, Haddington did not participate in the military, but was a conscientious attender of Parliament. Haddington attended the coronation of Charles II at Scone Abbey in 1651, and was later fined the sum of £555 11s 8d under Cromwell's Act of Grace.
 
Haddington died on 31 August 1669 at Tyninghame House, East Lothian.

Marriage and issue
In 1648, Lord Haddington wed Lady Christian Lindsay (d.1704), daughter to the Lord Treasurer of Scotland, John Lindsay, 17th Earl of Crawford, and had issue:

Charles Hamilton, 5th Earl of Haddington
Hon. Thomas Hamilton, died in infancy
Hon. John Hamilton, died in infancy
Hon. William Hamilton, died in infancy
Lady Margaret Hamilton, married John  Hope of Hopetoun, and had issue: Charles Hope, 1st Earl of Hopetoun
Lady Catherine Hamilton, died in infancy
Lady Anna Hamilton, died in infancy
Lady Helen Hamilton, married William Anstruther
Lady Susanna Hamilton, married Adam Cockburn, Lord Ormiston 
Lady Christian Hamilton, died in infancy
Lady Elizabeth Hamilton, died in infancy
Lady Mary Hamilton

References

Notes

Sources
 Anderson, J., Historical and genealogical memoirs of the House of Hamilton; with genealogical memoirs of the several branches of the family, Edinburgh 1825.
 Balfour Paul, Sir J., Scots Peerage IX vols. Edinburgh 1904.

1626 births
1669 deaths
4
Members of the Privy Council of Scotland
17th-century Scottish people
Place of birth missing